José Andres Salvatierra López (born 10 October 1989) is a Costa Rican football player, currently playing for Sporting San José , and for the Costa Rica national football team.

He plays as a fullback.

Club career
Salvatierra made his professional debut on 7 April 2010 for Liga against Águilas Guanacastecas.

Salvatierra moved to Major League Soccer side FC Dallas on 16 December 2016.

On 24 January 2017, FC Dallas announced the club and Salvatierra agreed to part ways due to the player failing his physical and medical exams before the MLS Preseason.

International career
Salvatierra made his senior debut for Costa Rica in a June 2011 CONCACAF Gold Cup match against Cuba and earned a total of 26 caps, scoring no goals. He represented his country in 5 FIFA World Cup qualification matches and played at the 2011 CONCACAF Gold Cup, 2011 Copa América and 2013 Copa Centroamericana.

Honours

Club
Alajuelense
Liga FPD: Apertura 2010, Clausura 2011, Apertura 2011, Apertura 2012, Apertura 2013, Apertura 2020
CONCACAF League: 2020

International
Costa Rica
Copa Centroamericana: 2013

References

External links
 

1989 births
Living people
People from Escazú (canton)
Association football defenders
Costa Rican footballers
Costa Rica international footballers
2011 CONCACAF Gold Cup players
2011 Copa América players
2013 Copa Centroamericana players
2017 CONCACAF Gold Cup players
Copa América Centenario players
L.D. Alajuelense footballers
Liga FPD players
Copa Centroamericana-winning players